Postmodernism, or, the Cultural Logic of Late Capitalism is a 1991 book by Fredric Jameson, in which the author offers a critique of modernism and postmodernism from a Marxist perspective. The book began as a 1984 article in the New Left Review.

For Jameson, postmodernism is a forced but highly permeating field, given that cultures are formed through mass media ("mass culture"). This so-called mass culture indirectly forces us to shape our ideologies and brings us under the influence of media culture—a process that Jameson calls hegemony. This hegemony however has nothing to do with the postcolonial idea of colonization; rather it is a form of hegemony in the postmodern world, where media and capitalism play the most significant role in colonizing people's thoughts and ways of life.

Jameson argues that postmodernism is the age of the end of traditional ideologies. The ending of traditional ideologies can be seen through new wave of the aesthetic productions. He uses architecture and painting as examples. For instance, he draws out the differences between mindsets of modernism and postmodernism by comparing Van Gogh's “Peasant Shoes” with Andy Warhol's “Diamond Dust Shoes”.
 
For Jameson, postmodernism, as mass-culture driven by capitalism, pervades every aspect of our daily lives. Whether we want it or not, we imbibe it. This in turn makes it a "popular" culture of the masses.

See also
 Late capitalism

References

External links 
 Postmodernism, or, the Cultural Logic of Late Capitalism, parts of chapter one

1991 non-fiction books
Books about globalization
Books by Fredric Jameson
20th-century philosophy
Continental philosophy
Duke University Press books
English-language books
Marxist books
Political philosophy literature
Works about postmodernism